Sai Lau Kong is a village in the Sha Tau Kok area of North District of Hong Kong.

Features
The Sai Lau Kong Fish Culture Zone, one of the 26 designated marine fish culture zones in Hong Kong, is located in Ngau Shi Wu Wan, a bay west of Sai Lau Kong and northeast of Ngau Shi Wu.

References

External links
 Delineation of area of existing village Sai Lau Kong (Sha Tau Kok) for election of resident representative (2019 to 2022)

Villages in North District, Hong Kong
Sha Tau Kok